Halblech is a municipality in the district of Ostallgäu in Bavaria in Germany.

Notable people 
 Monika Bader, German alpine skier

References

Ostallgäu